Yu Xiaosong (born 1937) was a former member of the 9th National CPPCC Committee. Promoted to director of Ministry of Foreign Trade, Foreign Investment Department in 1987. Awarded the "Premier Trade Award" by the Japanese Prime Minister in 1998 for his work improving economic & trade ties with the Japan. Deputy Secretary of the Beijing Municipal Government during Tiananmen Square protests.

Yu graduated from Tsinghua University.

References

1937 births
Living people